Outi may refer to:

 Outi (name), a Finnish female given name
 Oud, a Greek musical instrument sometimes referred to by its Greek name Outi